Travis Tremayne Tyler, (born March 17, 1977) better known by the stage name Thi'sl is an American Christian hip hop producer and songwriter from St. Louis, Missouri. In 2007 Thi'sl was signed to the record label X-Hustler where he recorded three studio albums, After This House I Shall Live, Chronicles of an X-Hustler and Beautiful Monster. In 2012 he was featured on Lecrae's album Gravity which won a Grammy award.

Biography 

Travis Tremayne Tyler was born in Greenwood, Mississippi on March 17, 1977. As a baby Thi'sl and his family moved to St. Louis, Missouri where at the age of 14 Thi'sl started rapping. Under the name Uncle Y he recorded his first demo, however his album was influenced by the gang activity which he was involved in. After living and rapping about the street life, Thi'sl eventually straightened up his life and devoted it to positive rapping.

Thi'sl has been involved helping in the community of Ferguson, Missouri after the shooting of an 18-year-old man, Michael Brown. He recently addressed the public about justice issues in the St. Louis, Missouri area and he put together a peace response, calling out the community and church to take part in the healing of the community. On December 13, 2014, Thi'sl teamed up with Bubba Watson and donated $25,000 to repair vandalism and stolen technology at local Ferguson school Griffith Elementary.

Discography

References

External links 
 

1977 births
African-American Christians
African-American songwriters
Musicians from Mississippi
Musicians from Missouri
Christian hip hop
People from Greenwood, Mississippi
Rappers from Mississippi
Rappers from St. Louis
Living people
Songwriters from Missouri
Songwriters from Mississippi
21st-century American rappers
21st-century African-American musicians
20th-century African-American people